Ferenc Szekszárdi (born 22 September 1979) is a Hungarian-born Australian canoeist. He competed in the men's C-1 200 metres and men's C-2 1000 metres events at the 2016 Summer Olympics.

References

External links
 

1979 births
Living people
Australian male canoeists
Olympic canoeists of Australia
Canoeists at the 2016 Summer Olympics
Place of birth missing (living people)
Hungarian emigrants to Australia